St. John High School was a private, Roman Catholic high school in Gulfport, Mississippi.  It was located in the Roman Catholic Diocese of Biloxi.

Background
St. John High School was founded in 1900.  It was replaced by St. Patrick Catholic High School in Biloxi in August, 2007.

Notable alumni 

 Steven Palazzo, U.S. House Representative for Mississippi's 4th Congressional District

Notes and references

Buildings and structures in Gulfport, Mississippi
Defunct Catholic secondary schools in the United States
Defunct schools in Mississippi
Educational institutions disestablished in 2007
Educational institutions established in 1900
Roman Catholic Diocese of Biloxi
Schools in Harrison County, Mississippi
1900 establishments in Mississippi